The Vietnamese National Futsal Cup (Viet: Giải Futsal Cup Quốc Gia) is a futsal cup competition in Vietnam. Hải Phương Nam (later known as Sahako F.C) won the first edition of the tournament.

The tournament plays on knock-out basis, so the winner of the tournament is the unbeaten team in each edition. Thái Sơn Nam is the most successful team with 4 times champion.

List of winners 

(*) To be played in early 2017

Top-performing clubs

References 

Futsal competitions in Vietnam